Trip-Tease and High C's is a 1959 Australian television revue which featured an early performance by Barry Humphries. The show was announced in January 1959, off the back of the success of Humphries' first special.

Cast
Barry Humphries
Melissa Jaffer
Edward Brayshaw

Reception
The production was well received. However Humphries then went to England and the ABC refused to put on more shows unless they were of sufficiently high quality.

References

External links
 

Australian television films
Films directed by William Sterling (director)
1950s English-language films